François-Pierre-Auguste Léger (Bernay, Eure, 16 March 1766 – Paris, 28 March 1823) was an 18th–19th-century French playwright.

Short biography 
The son of a surgeon, he became a tutor for sons of the bourgeoisie then left teaching to join a troupe of actors at the theaters du Vaudeville (1790–1797) and des Troubadours (1797–1800). He played the roles of lovers and fools and also started writing, playing in the first plays he wrote such as L'Auteur d'un moment that made him known to the public. After seven years at the Vaudeville, it passed to the Troubadours of which he became deputy director until bankruptcy forced the theatre to closed down on 1 March 1800.

After he became a teacher of literature and morality in a ladies boarding school (1801), he obtained a position of clerk of court in Saint-Denis but continued to have his plays presented at the Théâtre du Palais-Royal, the Théâtre des Variétés, the Théâtre-Français, the Théâtre de la Gaîté or the Théâtre de l'Odéon.

The First Restoration had him lose his position of registrar but he managed to find a post in the administration of revenue stamp before becoming theatre manager of the Théâtre de Nantes (1816-1818).

He died rue du Croissant in Paris aged 57 on 28 March 1823.

Works 

1790: Le Danger des conseils, ou la Folle inconstance, comedy in 1 act and in verse
1790: L'Orphelin et le curé, historical fact, in 1 act and in prose
1790: La Folle gageure, comedy in 1 act and in prose
1792: Alain et Rosette, one-act comédie en vaudevilles
1792: L'Apothéose du jeune Barra, one-act tableau patriotique, mingled with ariettes, with Louis Emmanuel Jadin
1792: L'Auteur d'un moment, one-act comedy, in verse and in vaudevilles
1792: La Cinquantaine, one-act comedy in prose and in vaudeville
1792: L'isle des femmes, divertissement in 1 act and in vaudevilles
1792: Joconde, comedy in 2 acts and in vaudevilles
1793: L'Heureuse décade, divertissement patriotique, in i act and in vaudevilles, with Pierre-Yves Barré and Jean-René Rosières
1793: Nicaise, peintre, opéra comique in one act and in prose
1793: Le Dédit mal gardé, divertissement patriotique in 1 act, in prose and in vaudevilles, with Louis Philipon de La Madelaine
1793: La Gageure inutile ou Plus de peur que de mal, one-act comedy
1793: Georges et Gros-Jean, ou l'Enfant trouvé, historical fact, in 1 act and in vaudevilles
1793: La Papesse Jeanne, one-act comedy
1794: Christophe Dubois, historical fact in 1 act and in prose, mingled with vaudevilles
1795: Le Sourd guéri, ou Les tu et les vous, one-act comedy, mingled with vaudevilles, with Barré
1796: Angélique et Melcour, ou le Procès, one-act comedy
1796: Ziste et zeste, ou les Importuns, folie in 1 act and in vaudevilles, with Jean-François Cailhava de L'Estandoux
1797: Belle et bonne ou les Deux soeurs, one-act comedy
1798: Le Déménagement du Salon ou le Portrait de Gilles, comédie-parade in 1 act and in vaudevilles, with Noël Aubin, René de Chazet and Emmanuel Dupaty
1798: L'Homme sans façon, ou le Vieux cousin, comedy in 3 acts and in verse
1799: La Journée de Saint-Cloud, ou Le dix-neuf brumaire, divertissement-vaudeville in 1 act and in prose, with de Chazet and Armand Gouffé
1799: Il faut un état, ou La revue de l'an six, proverbe in 1 act, in prose and in vaudevilles, with Jean-Michel-Pascal Buhan and de Chazet
1800: La Clef forée, ou la 1re représentation, one-act anecdote in vaudevilles, with Auguste Creuzé de Lesser
1801: Le Vieux major, vaudeville in 1 act and in prose, with René Charles Guilbert de Pixérécourt
1802: Les Aveugles mendiants ou Partie et revanche, one-act vaudeville anecdotique
1802: Un Tour de jeune homme, anecdote in 1 act and in prose, with de Chazet
1803: Rhétorique épistolaire, ou Principaux élémens de l'art oratoire appliqués au genre épistolaire, suivis d'un traité succint sur la manière de lire et de réciter à haute voix
1804: Henri de Bavière, opéra en 3 actes, with Antoine-Pierre Dutramblay
1804: Bombarde, ou les Marchands de chansons, parody of Ossian, ou les Bardes , five-act lyrical melodrama, with Joseph Servières
1804: Un Quart-d'heure d'un sage, one-act comedy, mingled with vaudevilles, with Servières
1805: Le Billet de logement, one-act comedy, mingled with vaudevilles
1806: La Belle hôtesse, one-act comedy, mingled with vaudevilles, with de Chazet
1811: Le Billet de loterie, one-act comedy, with de Chazet
1816: Henri IV à Billière, two-act comedy in verse
1817: Maria, ou la Demoiselle de compagnie, comedy in 1 act and in verse
1818: John Bull, ou Voyage à l'île des chimères
1819: Macédoine, ou Poésies et chansons érotiques, badines et grivoises, Béchet aîné
1819: M. Partout, ou le Dîner manqué, one-act tableau-vaudeville
1821: Un Dimanche à Passy, ou M. Partout, one-act tableau-vaudeville, with de Chazet and Marc-Antoine Désaugiers
1821: Le Fruit défendu, comédie en vaudeville in 1 act, with Gabriel-Alexandre Belle

Bibliography 
 Charles Ménétrier, Galerie historique des comédiens de la troupe de Nicolet, 1869, (p. 212-217) 
 Ludovic Lalanne, Dictionnaire historique de la France, 1877, (p. 1113)
 Henry Lyonnet, Dictionnaire des comédiens français, 1911

External links 
 François-Pierre-Auguste Léger on data.bnf.fr 

18th-century French dramatists and playwrights
19th-century French dramatists and playwrights
French theatre managers and producers
Writers from Normandy
1766 births
1823 deaths